Sözeri (literally "man ( (definite accusative eri)) of the word") is a Turkish surname and may refer to:

 Ayşe Sözeri (1974), Turkish windsurfer
 Ayta Sözeri (1976), Turkish actress and singer
 Erkan Sözeri (1966), Turkish football manager and former player

Turkish-language surnames